Tanja Kiridžić (born 1986) is a Croatian team handball player. She plays on the Croatian national team, and participated at the 2011 World Women's Handball Championship in Brazil.

In 2013/14 is player of Slovak club Iuventa Michalovce.

References

1986 births
Living people
Croatian female handball players
Mediterranean Games competitors for Croatia
Competitors at the 2009 Mediterranean Games
21st-century Croatian women